Ișalnița is a commune in Dolj County, Oltenia, Romania with a population of 3,922 people. It is composed of a single village, Ișalnița.

References

Communes in Dolj County
Localities in Oltenia